John Ben Shepperd (October 19, 1915 – March 8, 1990) was an American lawyer, businessman, and politician who served as the Secretary of State (1950–1952) and Attorney General (1953–1957) for the U.S. state of Texas.

Early life and education 
John Ben Shepperd was born in Gladewater, Texas to Alfred Fulton Shepperd and Berthal (Phillips) Shepperd. He came from a political family. His father served as a county commissioner in Gregg County, Texas. His grandfather, Ben Phillips, served in the Texas House of Representatives in the 1880s.

He attended the University of Texas at Austin, graduating in 1938 with his undergraduate degree, and in 1941 with an L.L.B.

While attending the University of Austin, he met fellow student Mamie (Steiber) Shepperd of Yorktown, Texas. They were married in 1938 and had two sons, Johnny and Al, and twin daughters, Marianne (Morse) and Suzanne (McIntosh).

Political career 
After a short period in private practice and two years in the military, Shepperd was elected to the Gregg County Commissioners Court in 1946 at the age of 30.

In 1950, he was appointed Texas Secretary of State by then-Governor, Allan Shivers.

In 1952 he was elected Texas Attorney General, a position to which he was re-elected in 1954.

He was elected president of the National Association of Attorneys General in 1956.

Brown v. Board of Education (1954) 
Following the Brown v. Board decision, the U.S. Supreme Court asked the Attorneys General of all states to submit their plans for desegregation to the Court. Shepperd presented the State of Texas plan before the Court on behalf of the State of Texas. In discussing his arguments before the Court, Shepperd stated "The Supreme Court cannot be the master school board for the nation." He further stated "It is unrealistic to think that Edwards County, with one school-aged Negro, and Marion County, with its sixty percent Negro school population, may have their different problems solved from Washington or even Austin."

State of Texas v. NAACP (1956) 
On August 30, 1956, three black students attempted to enroll at segregated Mansfield High School following a federal court order mandating integration of Mansfield public schools in a lawsuit brought by the NAACP. The incident gained national attention and infuriated Governor Allan Shivers, who referred to the NAACP as "paid agitators", and sought to curb the group's power in Texas, using the office of the Texas Attorney General. On September 13, 1956, just two weeks after the Mansfield incident, John Ben Shepperd brought suit against the Texas Chapter of the National Association for the Advancement of Colored People seeking to investigate and examine files, records and accounts of the NAACP branches in Houston and Dallas. On September 21, 1956, the State of Texas requested a temporary restraining order to force the NAACP to halt their activities, claiming that the NAACP had violated their state charter, which permitted only non-profit, charitable, and educational activities. The three main charges were: 1) practicing law without a license and barratry (the offense of frequently instigating lawsuits), 2) involvement in political activities by lobbying and supporting partisan candidates, and 3) making pecuniary profit. The request was granted and later became permanent, resulting in the NAACP being unable to operate in Texas well into the 1960s.

Shepperd considered his efforts to restrict the NAACP in State of Texas v. NAACP one of his greatest accomplishments in public office.

Post-political career and legacy 
Shepperd returned to private practice in Odessa, Texas in 1957. In addition to his law practice, he served on a number of boards, including as a director of Blue Cross Blue Shield of Texas. He was an advocate for the creation of a university in the permian basin, which eventually opened in 1973 as the University of Texas Permian Basin. In 1995 the Texas Legislature created the John Ben Shepperd Leadership Institute at the University of Texas Permian Basin.

The saying "Freedom is not Free" is attributed to him.

References

1915 births
1990 deaths
Texas Attorneys General
Secretaries of State of Texas
Texas lawyers
Texas Democrats
University of Texas at Austin alumni
20th-century American lawyers